Barea may refer to:

Barea (genus), a concealer moth genus
Barea (surname), including a list of people with the name
Barea Soranus, 1st century Roman senator
Barea or Barya, other names for the Nara language of Eritrea
 The nickname for the Madagascar national football team